Sonal Monteiro is an Indian actress. She appeared in many Coastalwood and Sandalwood movies.

Early life 
Sonal joined St. Agnes College, Mangalore. During her studies, she joined the modelling industry and won Miss Beautiful Smile 2013, Miss Konkan 2015. She first appeared in "Anjea Sarkhen Chedun" Konkani Album Song of Late. Jerome Dsouza from the Konkani Music Album - NAACH KONKANNANT, Which released on YouTube in the year 2013 and gained popularity in coastal region.

Career 
She made her acting debut in 2015 as the lead actress in the Tulu film Ekka Saka. Sonal then played a modern girl role in Jai Tulunad and then played the lead role in the romantic comedy Pilibail Yamunakka. Her Sandalwood film Abhisaarike got released in 2018. In 2018 another film MLA with Pratham also released,  released in 2018. Sonal Monteiro signed on to a Bollywood Film Saajan Chale Sasuraal 2 . She has two additional Sandalwood films Gaalipata 2 and Buddivantha 2 in production Stage. Sonal Monteiro's recent Release Panchatantra film directed by Yograj Cinema's was superhit rom-com, Panchatantra. She also played important star role in the Roberrt 2021.

Alongside her acting career, Sonal participates in stage shows, is on the Jury for Beauty Pageants and sings. Sonal is the Director of Fashion ABCD a Fashion event & Celebrity management Company.

Filmography

References

External links

1995 births
Living people
Actresses from Mangalore
Indian film actresses
Actresses in Tulu cinema
Actresses in Kannada cinema
Actresses in Hindi cinema
Konkani people